The School of Computational Sciences is a institute affiliated to Swami Ramanand Teerth Marathwada University (SRTMU) in Nanded in the Indian state of Maharashtra. Srtmun college NAC committee given by A grade .

About School

About the School of Computational Sciences. The need of this school was for awareness of education in computational sciences in
the region and assisting in the development of potential manpower of computer professionals
from this area.
General Introduction of the School
The School of Computational Sciences is having almost 100% off campus placement record
in the Marathwada region and the feat is all set to maintain the same. The faculty of the
School is young and dynamic with diverse academic background and invaluable practical
experience. The School has the courses related to the latest trends and technologies associated
with the computers. The School has well equipped laboratories with state of the art allied
facilities.
Academics of the school are highly innovative and provide lot of practical flexibility. The
evaluation of student consists of continuous internal evaluation and opens to the students as
in well known institutes. Faculty members and students of the School participated and
initiated several projects, attended conferences with the research related activities.

History 

It was established with the inception of Swami Ramanand Teerth Marathwada University (1994). This school provides education in computational/computer sciences.

Curriculum 

Courses Offered by the institute are :
 ·Ph.D. (Computer Science) 
 ·M.Phil. (Computer Science) 
 M. Sc. (Computer Science)
 M. Sc. (Computer Application) 
 M. Sc. (Computer Network) The course is of 2 year/4 semester duration
 Master of Computer Application. (M.C.A.) The course is 3 years/6 semesters duration

References

External links
 Computational Sciences, Swami Ramanand Teerth Marathwada University

Computer science in India
Information technology in India